The year 1809 in science and technology involved some significant events, listed below.

Astronomy
 Carl Friedrich Gauss publishes  in Hamburg, introducing the Gaussian gravitational constant and containing an influential treatment of the least squares method.

Biology
 Jean-Baptiste Lamarck publishes Philosophie Zoologique, outlining his theory of evolution.
 Johann Heinrich Friedrich Link first describes Penicillium.

Geology
 William Maclure publishes the first geological map of the United States with accompanying memoir.

Mathematics
 Louis Poinsot describes the two remaining Kepler-Poinsot polyhedra.

Medicine
 December 25 – American physician Ephraim McDowell performs the world's first ovariotomy, the removal of an ovarian tumor.
 Philippe Pinel publishes accounts of what would later be regarded as schizophrenia.

Technology
 February 11 – Robert Fulton patents the steamboat in the United States.
 May 5 – Mary Kies becomes one of the first women granted a U.S. patent, for a technique of weaving straw hats with silk and thread.
 Samuel Thomas von Sömmerring invents a water voltameter electrical telegraph.
 William Hyde Wollaston invents the reflecting goniometer.

Awards
 Copley Medal: Edward Troughton

Births
 January 4 – Louis Braille (died 1852), French inventor.
 January 6 – Marie Durocher (died 1893), Brazilian physician.
 February 12 – Charles Darwin (died 1882), English naturalist.
 February 15 – Cyrus McCormick (died 1884), American inventor.
 February 21 – Carl Ernst Bock (died 1874), German physician and anatomist.
 April 7 – James Glaisher (died 1903), English meteorologist and balloonist.
 April 15 – Hermann Grassmann (died 1877), German mathematician.
 April 20 – James David Forbes (died 1868), Scottish physicist, glaciologist and seismologist.
 August 29 – Oliver Wendell Holmes, Sr. (died 1894), American physician and writer.
 November 22 – Bénédict Morel (died 1873), French psychiatrist.
 Date unknown – William Lobb (died 1864), English plant collector.

Deaths
 May 17 – Leopold Auenbrugger (born 1722), Austrian physician.
 August 18 – Matthew Boulton (born 1728), English mechanical engineer.
 October 11 – Meriwether Lewis (born 1774), American explorer.
 December 16 – Antoine François, comte de Fourcroy (born 1755), French chemist.
 December 29 – Thomas Barker (born 1722), English meteorologist.

References

 
19th century in science
1800s in science